James Hart (1825–1873) was a politician in the New South Wales Legislative Assembly.

Early life
Hart was born in Carlow, Ireland in 1825. He was son of William Hart and Mary Cahill. Hart arrived in New South Wales in 1841. He was admitted as a solicitor in 1853. He practised in Sydney and was part owner of a practice.

Politics
Hart began his career in politics in 1858 when Abram Moriarty resigned from the seat of New England and Macleay in the colony's north. He won the show of hands and was declared elected when neither candidate called for a poll. The seat was abolished in 1859, replaced by New England and Tenterfield, with Hart successfully contesting New England at the 1859 election, winning by a mere two votes, a result that was upheld by the Elections and Qualifications Committee. At the 1860 election, Hart won the election for the seat of Bathurst in the colony's west on 6 December 1860. As such, he withdrew from the New England contest which was held on 24 December. At the following election in 1864–65, Hart changed seats again when he elected to the multi-member electorate of East Sydney. He did not recontest the 1869–70 election but Hart re-entered the parliament in 1870 after winning the Monara by-election caused by the death of Daniel Egan. Hart retired from parliament in February 1872.

Personal life
Hart married Harriet Dawson on 7 September 1843.

Death

References

 

Date of birth missing
1825 births
1873 deaths
Members of the New South Wales Legislative Assembly
Australian people of Irish descent
19th-century Australian politicians